Evelyn Evelyn is the debut studio album by the fictional musical duo Evelyn Evelyn, created and portrayed by Amanda Palmer and Jason Webley. Released on March 30, 2010, it is a concept album about the lives of the titular Evelyn and Evelyn Neville, a pair of conjoined twin sisters.

A worldwide tour/stage presentation in support of the album was planned for the spring and summer of 2010, including stops in New York City and London.

Background and overview
Evelyn Evelyn are a fictional musical duo created and portrayed by American musicians Amanda Palmer and Jason Webley. The duo consists of Evelyn and Evelyn Neville, a pair of conjoined twins said to have been discovered in 2007 by Palmer and Webley. Evelyn Evelyn is concept album about the sisters' lives.

One of the tracks from the album, "My Space", includes guest vocals from Kim and Zoe Boekbinder, Margaret Cho, Corn Mo, Morningwood vocalist Chantal Claret, Frances Bean Cobain, Neil Gaiman, Ethan Gold, Ari Gold, Eugene Mirman, Franz Nicolay, Reverend Peyton, Tegan and Sara, Soko, Mindless Self Indulgence songwriter/vocalist Jimmy Urine, Kirsten Vangsness, Andrew W.K., My Chemical Romance vocalist Gerard Way, and "Weird Al" Yankovic. In a blog post, Palmer wrote:

Release and reception

The album's cover artwork (done by the award-winning artist Cynthia von Buhler) as well as a brand-new song ("A Campaign of Shock and Awe") were debuted on the band's Myspace on December 8, 2009, shortly before the twins began using their Twitter and Facebook.

Track listing

Notes

References

2010 debut albums
Evelyn Evelyn albums
Concept albums